Russell Mathew Rimmington  (born 29 December 1945), commonly known as Russ Rimmington, was the 30th Mayor of Hamilton, New Zealand.

Rimmington was born on 29 December 1945 in Oamaru, New Zealand. In the 2003 New Year Honours, he was appointed a Companion of the Queen's Service Order for public services. Following the 2019 local elections, he was elected chair of the Waikato Regional Council. In May 2022 he was removed as chair by the council and replaced with Barry Quayle, due to racist comments he had made regarding the Three Waters reform programme in October 2021.

References

1945 births
Living people
Mayors of Hamilton, New Zealand
People from Oamaru
Companions of the Queen's Service Order
New Zealand justices of the peace
Waikato regional councillors